The 1978 South Carolina Gamecocks football team represented the University of South Carolina as an independent during the 1978 NCAA Division I-A football season. Led by fourth-year head coach Jim Carlen, the Gamecocks compiled a record of 5–5–1.

Schedule

Roster

References

South Carolina
South Carolina Gamecocks football seasons
South Carolina Gamecocks football